Elachista deriventa is a moth of the family Elachistidae. It is found in southern Finland and Sweden.

Adults are on wing in June.

The larvae feed on Calamagrostis arundinacea. They mine the leaves of their host plant. The mine has the form of a pale yellowish, rather narrow, inconspicuous, ascending corridor in the distal half of the leaf. It runs along the leaf margin. The frass is deposited along the sides. Larvae can be found from September to October. They are pale yellowish.

References

deriventa
Moths described in 2008
Moths of Europe